The Institut National des Archives du Congo (INACO) are the national archives of the Democratic Republic of the Congo. It is located in Kinshasa and it has a collection of 3,000 volumes.

The national archives in their current form were founded by the ordinance n° 89/027 of 26 January 1989 as the Archives Nationales du Zaïre (ARNAZA), later Archives Nationales de la République démocratique du Congo (ARNACO). The decree n° 15/022 of 9 December 2015 restructured the ARNACO to a new public institution, the INACO. In 2019, the Department of State of the United States financed a renovation project for the INACO.

See also 

 List of national archives

References 

Congo, Democratic Republic of the
Archives in the Democratic Republic of the Congo